The Crown Proceedings Act 1947 (c. 44) is an Act of the Parliament of the United Kingdom that allowed, for the first time, civil actions against the Crown to be brought in the same way as against any other party. The Act also reasserted the common law doctrine of Crown privilege but by making it, for the first time, justiciable paved the way for the development of the modern law of public interest immunity.

The Act received royal assent on 31 July 1947 and came into force on 1 January 1948.

There remain significant differences between Crown proceedings and claims between private parties, especially as to enforcement of judgments.

Background
Before the Act, the Crown could not be sued in contract. However, as it was seen to be desirable that Crown contractors could obtain redress, they would otherwise be inhibited from taking on such work, so a petition of right came to be used in such situations, especially after the Petitions of Right Act 1860 simplified the process.

Before the petition could be heard by the courts, it had to be endorsed with the words fiat justitia on the advice of the Home Secretary and Attorney-General.

Similarly, the Crown could not be sued in tort. The usual remedy was for the complainant to sue the public servant responsible for the injury. A famous example was the case of Entick v Carrington. The Crown usually indemnified the servant against any damages.

Henry Brougham called for equality between Crown and subjects in a House of Commons motion in 1828 but it was to be a further century before the proposal was realised. Government departments came up with a range of pragmatic devices to mitigate some of the effects of Crown immunity, and although these left many problems unaddressed, many lawyers and politicians believed that the law generally struck a good balance.

In 1921 a Crown Proceedings Committee was established, following a campaign by the legal profession which was also supported by the Law Officers of the Crown. The Committee was chaired by Lord Hewart. The Committee was deeply divided on the question of whether the Crown should be made liable in tort, but was instructed by the Lord Chancellor to draft a bill on the basis that it was desirable, leaving the political question to be decided by the Government once the bill had been prepared. The Committee produced a draft Bill in 1927. However, little was done to progress it through Parliament due to opposition within the Government (primarily from Admiralty and Viscount Hailsham.)

In the 1940s, there was adverse criticism of the state of affairs from the House of Lords and the Court of Appeal. There was also political pressure on the Labour government from the trade unions, who feared that Crown immunity would severely affect the rights of workers in nationalised industries. The Lord Chancellor, Lord Jowitt, also believed that it was politically important to demonstrate that the Labour government was committed to maintaining the rights of citizens against the State. The result was that the Act was made a priority, and passed through Parliament in 1947 with little controversy and to general acclaim.

The Act

Actions allowed
Section 1 of the Act allows claims, for which a petition of right would previously have been demanded, to be brought in the courts directly as against any other defendant. However, a petition and fiat still appear to be necessary for personal claims against the monarch.

Section 2 renders the Crown liable as though it were a natural person for:
Torts committed by its servants and agents;
Common law duties of an employer to its servants and agents; and
Common law duties as an owner or occupier of property.

Section 2(2) provides that the Crown is liable for breach of statutory duty so long as the statute binds both the Crown and private persons.

Section 3 provides for the protection of patents, registered trade marks, design rights and copyrights from breach by Crown servants.

Limitations
Section 2(5) exempts the Crown from liability for any person exercising "responsibilities of a judicial nature". This means, for example, that a claim under the Human Rights Act 1998 may not be brought against the Crown with respect to judicial decisions, unless it is brought within a right of appeal according to Section 9 of that Act.

Section 10 exempted the Crown from actions for death or personal injury caused by members of the British Armed Forces to other members of the British Armed Forces. This section was suspended by the Crown Proceedings (Armed Forces) Act 1987, sections 1 and 2 with a power for the Secretary of State for Defence to revive it when "necessary and expedient". There was some retrospective litigation after the 1987 Act in which a declaration was made under the Human Rights Act 1998, section 4 that such immunity was compatible with the European Convention on Human Rights, article 6(1).

Crown privilege and public interest immunity
Section 28 gave the courts, for the first time, the power to order disclosure of documents by the Crown and require the Crown to answer requests for further information. This new power is subject to the important qualification in s.28(2) that the Crown can resist disclosure where this could be "injurious to the public interest". This reasserted the traditional doctrine of Crown privilege but also made the issue justiciable, ultimately giving rise to the doctrine of public-interest immunity.

Proceedings abolished
Apart from petitions of right, the Act abolished several ancient writs and procedures:
Latin informations and English informations;
Writs of capias ad respondendum, subpoena ad respondendum and writs of appraisement;
Writs of scire facias;
Proceedings for the determination of any issue upon a writ of extent or of diem clausit extremum;
Writs of summons under Part V of the Crown Suits Act 1865;
Proceedings against the Crown by way of monstrans de droit.

Amendments since royal assent
Sections 5 to 8 originally covered Admiralty claims but these sections were repealed and replaced by provisions under the Merchant Shipping Act 1995.

Section 9 originally excluded claims arising from the operations of the Post Office, including telegraphic and telephone services, other than the loss or damage of a registered letter. These provisions were repealed and replaced by the Post Office Act 1969.

References

Bibliography

United Kingdom Acts of Parliament 1947
Sovereign immunity